Jules Dumont d'Urville (1790–1842) was a French explorer and naval officer.

Dumont d'Urville may also refer to:

 French aviso Dumont d'Urville, a Bougainville-class aviso of the French Navy
 Dumont d'Urville Station, a French scientific station in Antarctica